Police diving is a branch of professional diving carried out by police services. Police divers are usually sworn police officers, and may either be employed full-time as divers or as general water police officers, or be volunteers who usually serve in other units but are called in if their diving services are required.

The duties carried out by police divers include rescue diving for underwater casualties and search and recovery diving for evidence and bodies.

"Public safety diving" is a term coined by Steven J Linton in the 1970s to describe underwater rescue, underwater recovery and underwater investigation conducted by divers working for or under the authority of municipal, state or federal agencies. These divers are typically members of police departments, sheriff's offices, fire rescue agencies, search and rescue teams or providers of emergency medical services. Public Safety Divers (PSDs) can be paid by the previously mentioned agencies or be non-paid volunteers.

Public safety diving 

An extract from NYPD Scuba Team on what public safety diving includes:
 Evidence recovery
 Submerged body recoveries (from accidents/suicides/crime victims)
 Anti-narcotics operations (inspecting ships hulls etc.)
 Anti-terrorism operations (Explosive Ordnance Disposal)
 Search and rescue operations
 Other maritime law enforcement

Due to the conditions in which accidents may happen, or where criminals may choose to dispose of evidence or their victims, police divers might need to dive:
 In murky canals, lakes, and rivers
 Currents that can run as fast as 6 knots
 In intake pipes and sewers
 In water towers

under hostile environmental conditions which can include:
 Sludge, mud, debris or thick vegetation
 Under ice
 At night time or with zero visibility
 Frigid water, rough seas and weather
 Strong currents
 Water with toxins or parasites

Recreational rescue diver courses 
Certification  as a "Rescue Diver" by recreational diver training agencies covers skills in self rescue or buddy rescue under the normal diving conditions that the diver was trained in and has become familiar with through experience. It includes training in how to avoid accidents by recognizing panicked divers and equipment failures and in case of an accident, basic first aid and how to manage a scene until professional rescue and medical assistance arrive. Although these are good courses for improving one's diving skills and further progressing in diving education they are not appropriate training for a professional rescue diver. Some professional training organisations expect a participant to be certified as a recreational rescue diver as a prerequisite for training as a professional rescue diver.

Professional public safety diving courses 

For this purpose, diving training agencies such as Emergency Response Diving International (ERDI), the National Academy of Police Diving (NAPD), Team Lifeguard Systems, and Underwater Criminal Investigators have developed special courses to train divers on how to safely respond to situations where the hazards exceed those acceptable for recreational diving.

UCI (Underwater Criminal Investigators) was founded in 1987 to provide professional underwater criminal investigations training to the public safety diving community.

The National Academy of Police Diving (NAPD) was formed in 1988 by a group of police divers to create a national standard for police and public safety diver training and certification. It has helped provide training for police officers, fire departments, military divers, and environmental investigators in the following locations: North America, Central America, Russia, Australia, and the Caribbean.

In South Africa, public safety diving and police diving falls under the Diving Regulations to the Occupational health and Safety Act, and such divers are required to be registered as commercial divers by the Department of Labour, and training is done by registered commercial diving schools.

Public safety diving equipment 
Companies like OMS and Zeagle, through the special requirements of public safety diving, have developed products specific for the task such as the OMS chemically resistant BCs, for diving in polluted water or HAZMAT conditions and Zeagle's SAR and 911 variation of their Ranger model BCD that have features like harness for helicopter lifts and swift-water work.

History
In Britain, in the early years of the British Sub-Aqua Club (BSAC), police often called on BSAC branches to dive to find submerged bodies, before the police started their own diving branches.

See also

References

External links
 Naui Worldwide Public Safety Dive Certification

Professional diving
Law enforcement techniques
Underwater diving procedures